The Golden Sheaf Award for the best Multicultural production is presented by the Yorkton Film Festival.

History
In 1947 the Yorkton Film Council was founded.  In 1950 the first Yorkton Film Festival was held in Yorkton, Saskatchewan, Canada.  During the first few festivals, the films were adjudicated by audience participation through ballot casting and winners were awarded Certificates of Merit by the film festival council.  In 1958 the film council established the Yorkton Film Festival Golden Sheaf Award for the category Best of Festival, awarded to the best overall film of the festival.  Over the years various additional categories were added to the competition.   As of 2020, the Golden Sheaf Award categories included: Main Entry Categories, Accompanying Categories, Craft Categories, and Special Awards.

In 1994 the Golden Sheaf Award for the best Multicultural production was added to the Accompanying Categories of the film festival competition. The winner of this award is determined by a panel of jurors chosen by the film council. Films in any genre that reflect Canada’s racial diversity and multicultural landscape are considered for this award.

Winners

1990s

2000s

2010s

2020s

References 

Awards established in 1994
Yorkton Film Festival awards